A Sınırname was a type of document in the Ottoman empire, representing an area of land; similar to a modern title deed, although often describing a larger area such as a village or district, rather than a single residence. 

A sınırname would be granted by a higher authority - even the sultan. It would describe the boundary of the land. A sınırname might be issued like a land grant, or it might be issued following resolution of a border dispute (for instance, by a kadi).

Sınırname also described land usage; they were parallel to the system of defters which were used for taxation.

References

Land management in the Ottoman Empire
Property law